Nicola Anna Grigg is a New Zealand politician and Member of Parliament in the House of Representatives representing the Selwyn electorate. She is a member of the National Party.

Early life
Grigg was born and raised in Mount Somers. Two of her great-grandparents were Members of Parliament for Mid-Canterbury between 1938 and 1943: Arthur Grigg and Mary Grigg (who was the first woman MP for the National Party, completing Arthur's term after his death). Grigg is also a third-great-granddaughter (through Mary Grigg) of John Cracroft Wilson, a British-educated civil servant in India, farmer and politician in New Zealand and Sir John Hall, an English-born New Zealand politician who served as the 12th premier of New Zealand from 1879 to 1882.

Grigg worked as a journalist for both Newstalk ZB and Radio New Zealand before shifting her career to politics. She worked for Bill English both during his tenure as finance minister and prime minister. She later worked for leader of the opposition Simon Bridges. She then left working at parliament and took up a position at New Zealand Trade and Enterprise.

Political career

Grigg was selected as the National Party candidate for the Selwyn electorate in November 2019 on the first ballot, ahead of two other nominees: Simon Flood and Craig Watson.

In the 2020 general election, she was elected to the Selwyn seat with a final majority of 4,968 votes. Following the election, Grigg served as National's spokesperson for women and, from August 2021, trade and export growth.

On 19 January 2023, Grigg was also given the responsibility for Spokesperson for Rural Communities, Animal Welfare, Biosecurity, Food Safety and Associate Spokesperson for Agriculture. However, she lost the trade and expert growth portfolio.

Personal life
Grigg previously dated former All Black captain Richie McCaw.

Views and position
Grigg has supported the establishment of safe zones around abortion providers and hospitals. While voting for the Contraception, Sterilisation, and Abortion (Safe Areas) Amendment Act 2022 during its first reading in Parliament, Grigg argued that establishing abortion safe zones would reduce "harassment, hate speech, and intimidation" by anti-abortion protesters against vulnerable women.

References

Living people
New Zealand National Party MPs
New Zealand MPs for South Island electorates
Members of the New Zealand House of Representatives
21st-century New Zealand politicians
21st-century New Zealand women politicians
Women members of the New Zealand House of Representatives
People from Mid Canterbury
Year of birth missing (living people)